Aluminium gallium phosphide, a phosphide of aluminium and gallium, is a semiconductor material. It is an alloy of aluminium phosphide and gallium phosphide. It is used to manufacture light-emitting diodes emitting green light.

See also
 Aluminium gallium indium phosphide

External links
Light-Emitting Diode - An Introduction, Structure, and Applications of LEDs

Aluminium compounds
Gallium compounds
Phosphides
III-V semiconductors
III-V compounds
Zincblende crystal structure